In enzymology, a hydroxymethylpyrimidine kinase is an enzyme that catalyzes the chemical reaction

ATP + 4-amino-5-hydroxymethyl-2-methylpyrimidine  ADP + 4-amino-5-phosphonooxymethyl-2-methylpyrimidine

Thus, the two substrates of this enzyme are ATP and 4-amino-5-hydroxymethyl-2-methylpyrimidine, whereas its two products are ADP and 4-amino-5-phosphonooxymethyl-2-methylpyrimidine.

This enzyme belongs to the family of transferases, specifically those transferring phosphorus-containing groups (phosphotransferases) with an alcohol group as acceptor.  The systematic name of this enzyme class is ATP:4-amino-5-hydroxymethyl-2-methylpyrimidine 5-phosphotransferase. This enzyme is also called hydroxymethylpyrimidine kinase (phosphorylating).  This enzyme participates in thiamine metabolism.

References

 

EC 2.7.1
Enzymes of unknown structure